Pygmy shrew may refer to one of various species of shrews:
American pygmy shrew, Sorex hoyi
Eurasian pygmy shrew, Sorex minutus
 Etruscan shrew, Suncus etruscus

Animal common name disambiguation pages